Kalvesta is an unincorporated community in Finney County, Kansas, United States. Kalvesta consists only of two large grain elevators and a dealership for heavy farm implements, along with half a dozen houses.

History
Kalvesta was derived from the Greek kalos, meaning "beautiful", and Vesta, the Roman goddess of the hearth and home.

Kalvesta had a post office from the 1880s until 1998.

Climate
The climate in this area is characterized by hot, humid summers and generally mild to cool winters.  According to the Köppen Climate Classification system, Kalvesta has a humid subtropical climate, abbreviated "Cfa" on climate maps.

Education
The community is served by Cimarron–Ensign USD 102 public school district.

References

Further reading

External links
 Finney County maps: Current, Historic, KDOT

Unincorporated communities in Finney County, Kansas
Unincorporated communities in Kansas